Beaton Tulk (May 22, 1944 – May 23, 2019) was a Canadian educator, civil servant and politician. He served as the seventh premier of Newfoundland from 2000 to 2001 as a member of the Liberal Party of Newfoundland and Labrador.

Early life
Born in Ladle Cove, Newfoundland, Tulk was the youngest son of Sadie and Japhet Tulk. He graduated from Memorial University with BA, B.Ed, and Master of Educational Administration degrees. He also later obtained a Canadian Securities Investment Diploma.  An educator prior to politics, he was a supervising principal for the Carmanville school system from 1974 to 1979.

Political career
Tulk was first elected to the Newfoundland House of Assembly in 1979 as the Liberal Party of Newfoundland (later Liberal Party of Newfoundland and Labrador) member for Fogo, and was re-elected in 1982 and 1985. He was defeated in the 1989 election, and in 1990 became the Assistant Deputy Minister of Children and Youth Services for the Newfoundland government. He was returned to the House of Assembly for Fogo in 1993.  He was then elected in the newly redistributed riding of Bonavista North in 1996, and re-elected in 1999.

Tulk was appointed Minister of Forest Resources and Agrifoods in May 1997 and Minister of Development and Rural Renewal in July 1997. In December 1998, he stepped down from cabinet when he was the subject of allegations of wrongdoing by the owner of a private college. He was cleared of any wrongdoing by the police and by a commissioner's report, and returned to the cabinet in April 1999.  He was appointed Deputy Premier in August 2000 and Premier of Newfoundland in October 2000 when his predecessor, Brian Tobin, returned to federal politics. He was not a candidate in the race to succeed Tobin as Liberal leader and returned to the position of Deputy Premier in February 2001 when Roger Grimes was elected Liberal leader and sworn in as Premier.

In 2002, Tulk resigned his provincial seat to run unsuccessfully for the federal Liberals for the House of Commons of Canada seat of Gander—Grand Falls in a by-election after George Baker was appointed to the Senate, but was defeated by Rex Barnes. Tulk then tried to return to provincial politics, running in the provincial by-election resulting from his own resignation, but was defeated by Harry Harding.

On December 16, 2002, Tulk was appointed by the federal government of Jean Chrétien to the Canadian Transportation Agency.

Later life
In 2018, Flanker Press released his autobiography, A Man of My Word, co-written by Laurie Blackwood Pike. He lived in Musgravetown with his wife Dora during his final years.

Tulk died from prostate cancer on May 23, 2019, one day after his 75th birthday. He was diagnosed with the illness fifteen years prior to his death. Prime Minister Justin Trudeau praised Tulk's career of "putting people first" citing his death as a "loss of a great Canadian and a great Liberal".

References

1944 births
2019 deaths
Memorial University of Newfoundland alumni
Premiers of Newfoundland and Labrador
Liberal Party of Newfoundland and Labrador MHAs
People from Bonavista, Newfoundland and Labrador
Deputy premiers of Newfoundland and Labrador
21st-century Canadian politicians
Deaths from prostate cancer
Deaths from cancer in Newfoundland and Labrador